The Lie, is a 1970 Swedish television film directed by Jan Molander and written by Ingmar Bergman. Bergman wrote the script in 1968 with the name of "Reservatet: en banalitetens tragikomedi" (A tragicomedy of Banality). Although he did not direct it, he later tackled another relationship in a film with the same "Anna" and "Andreas" in the main roles: The Passion of Anna (1968).

The same script in translation was also used for two English language television productions. A 1970 British version was directed by Alan Bridges and a 1973 American version was directed by Alex Segal, both which used the title The Lie. The 1973 version starred Academy Award-nominated actors George Segal and Shirley Knight.

External links
 
 

Swedish television films
1970s Swedish-language films
Films with screenplays by Ingmar Bergman
1970 films
1970s Swedish films